William de Greystoke (died 1209), sometimes known as William FitzRanulf, Baron of Greystoke, was an English noble.

He was the eldest son of Ranulph de Greystoke and Amabel Balliol. William was in his minority when his father died. He was under the wardship of William de Stuteville before 1194, when he served during a campaign in Normandy. He was married to Helewise, the widow of William de Lancaster and Hugh de Morville, she was the daughter of Robert de Stuteville and Helewise de Murdac. William died in 1209 and was succeeded by his son Thomas,  who was in his minority. Thomas was placed into the wardship of Robert de Vipont, who paid 500 marks and 5 palfreys for the wardship of Thomas and the right to William’s widow Helewise. Robert married Thomas to his daughter Christian.

Citations

References
 

12th-century English people
13th-century English people
1209 deaths